Rosemary Husbands-Mathurin MBE is a Saint Lucian politician.

Husbands-Mathurin served as president of the Senate from 2007 to 2008, and speaker of the House of Assembly from 2008 to 2011. She was appointed parliamentary commissioner in 2017 and 2022.

She was appointed Member of the Order of the British Empire (MBE) in the 2022 Birthday Honours.

References

21st-century Saint Lucian women politicians
21st-century Saint Lucian politicians
Living people
Women legislative speakers
Presidents of the Senate of Saint Lucia
Speakers of the House of Assembly of Saint Lucia
Year of birth missing (living people)
Members of the Order of the British Empire